Kazimierówka may refer to the following places:
Kazimierówka, Chełm County in Lublin Voivodeship (east Poland)
Kazimierówka, Tomaszów Lubelski County in Lublin Voivodeship (east Poland)
Kazimierówka, Podlaskie Voivodeship (north-east Poland)
Kazimierówka, Masovian Voivodeship (east-central Poland)